The Violin Sonata No. 8 in G major, Op. 30, No. 3, by Ludwig van Beethoven, the third of his Opus 30 set, was written between 1801 and 1802, published in May 1803, and dedicated to Tsar Alexander I of Russia.

Structure

The sonata has three movements:

 Allegro assai
 Tempo di minuetto, ma molto moderato e grazioso – in E-flat major
 Allegro vivace

This sonata is characteristic of early/middle Beethoven in its solid sonata structure, just beginning to get adventurous in syncopation, with some extraordinary off beat sforzandi.

The work takes approximately 18 minutes to perform.

Notable recordings

Famous recordings of the sonata include one by Fritz Kreisler with Sergei Rachmaninoff at the piano.

External links
 
 

Violin Sonata 08
1802 compositions
Compositions in G major
Music dedicated to nobility or royalty